Nathaniel Hansen is an American documentary filmmaker. His independent film work includes Spearhunter, The Collection, Expired! Food Waste in America, The Elders, From the Heart, Hollow, and All the Presidents’ Heads.

Early life and education
Hansen was born in Portland, Oregon. He went to BYU-Hawaii and graduated in 2001 with a bachelor's degree in Cultural Studies and Humanities and an associate degree in theatre.

While in Hawaii, Hansen studied with folklorist and anthropologist Phillip McArthur, whose work on liminality, place and identity influenced Hansen's approach to filmmaking and teaching. McArthur chaired Hansen's BA thesis: Social Drama, Performance, and Identity; The Case of Kanaky, which took him to New Caledonia in 2001 to document indigenous Kanak dance performances, both modern and traditional. While there, Hansen met Dr. Virginia-Lee Webb, the curator of the exhibition and Archivist of the Photograph Collection in the Metropolitan Museum's Department of the Arts of Africa, Oceania, and the America at New York City's Metropolitan Museum.

In 2004 Hansen completed a master's degree in Visual Media Art from Emerson College and later returned to complete a Visual Arts MFA in 2011.

Career
From 2009-2011, while enrolled in further graduate studies at Emerson College, Hansen produced a series of short documentary films featuring “familiar strangers” or personalities he would regularly encounter in his commuting travels around downtown Boston. Pat Bartevian, the elderly woman featured in the second film and the most widely viewed in the series, served as the inspiration for his feature-length documentary film The Elders.

The Elders
After a successful 2010 kickstarter campaign, Hansen was contacted by Take Action Hollywood!, a non-profit organization founded by Maria Menounos. The organization made both a financial contribution and an in-kind equipment rental donation and Menounos is listed in the film's opening title sequence as a producer.

The Elders had its premiere at the 2013 Independent Film Festival Boston and was highlighted by Boston Globe film critic Peter Keough as “must see” and “remarkable.” During the festival, Hansen was featured in Boston Globe Magazine as one of six artists to watch.

Hollow
In 2012-2013, Hansen worked as one of the multimedia producers on Elaine McMillion Sheldon’s interactive documentary, Hollow. The project won a Peabody Award and was nominated for a national Emmy in 2014.

Filmography

Awards and nominations

References

External links
Official website
Nathaniel Hansen on IMDB.com

Living people
Artists from Portland, Oregon
American documentary film directors
American documentary film producers
American film editors
American cinematographers
Brigham Young University–Hawaii alumni
1977 births